Hippoliet Jan Van Peene (1 January 1811 in Kaprijke – 19 February 1864 in Ghent) was a Flemish physician and playwright.

He studied medicine at the State University of Leuven and became a physician in Kaprijke and later in Ghent.

In 1847 he wrote the lyrics of the Flemish anthem "De Vlaamse Leeuw" of which the music was composed by Karel Miry. He was the first modern Flemish playwright and he wrote 35 theatre plays, which in his time were performed by Broedermin en Taelyver in Ghent. At the inauguration of the Minard Theatre in 1847, his Brigitta of de Twee Vondelingen was performed.

Bibliography
 Keizer Karel en de Berchemsche Boer, comedy, 1841
 Jacob van Artevelde, historical drama, 1841
 Willem van Dampierre, historical drama, 1847
 Het Belfort of de Koop van Vlaanderen
 Jan de Vierde, historical drama, 1841 (400th anniversary of the Fonteinisten)
 Brigitta of de Twee Vondelingen, 1847

Sources
 Hippoliet Van Peene
 Verschaffel, H. 1998. Hippoliet Van Peene, Nieuwe encyclopedie van de Vlaamse Beweging (G–Q). Tielt: uitgeverij Lannoo, pp. 2406–2407.
 

1811 births
1864 deaths
Flemish activists
Flemish writers
State University of Leuven alumni